The George Halada Farmstead is located in Ellisville, Wisconsin.

History
George Halada was an immigrant from Bohemia. He would eventually acquire this property and operate it as a dairy farm. It remains in the family. The farm was added to the State Register of Historic Places in 1992 and to the National Register of Historic Places the following year.

References

Farms on the National Register of Historic Places in Wisconsin
National Register of Historic Places in Kewaunee County, Wisconsin
Dairy buildings in the United States
Italianate architecture in Wisconsin